Big City Blues is a 1997 Cineville film about a collection of characters who threaten to cross paths, unknowingly, during a night in the big city. The film focuses on the two hitmen Conner and Hudson, (Burt Reynolds and William Forsythe) who receive their contracts from an Englishman. A beautiful prostitute named Angela who dreams of a career as a model and is searching for her doppelgänger and two transvestites named Babs and Georgie.

References

External links
Big City Blues at the Internet Movie Database

1997 films
American comedy-drama films
1990s English-language films
1997 comedy-drama films
1990s American films